Hein Heckroth (14 April 1901 in Gießen - 7 July 1970 in Amsterdam) was a German art director of stage and film productions.

Heckroth began his career working with the German national ballet. Later, he moved to Great Britain and, after designing the sets and costumes for the first production of Don Giovanni at Glyndebourne in 1936, worked as a set and costume designer in films such as  A Matter of Life and Death (1946) and The Red Shoes (1948), for which he won the Academy Award for Best Art Direction). He was also nominated for two Academy Awards for his art direction and costume designs for The Tales of Hoffmann (1951).

His designs in "The Red Shoes" are preserved at MOMA in New York City and the British Film Institute in London.

See also
 List of German-speaking Academy Award winners and nominees

References

External links

Allmovie bio
 
 Hein-Heckroth-Gesellschaft e.V.

1901 births
1970 deaths
Best Art Direction Academy Award winners
German art directors